"Old Bridges Burn Slow" is a song written by Joe South, Jerry Meadors, and Sanford Brown, and recorded by American country music artist Billy Joe Royal.  It was released in February 1987 as the fourth single from the album Looking Ahead.  The song reached number 11 on the Billboard Hot Country Singles & Tracks chart.

Chart performance

References

1987 singles
1986 songs
Billy Joe Royal songs
Songs written by Joe South
Atlantic Records singles